The Mayogo people are an ethnic group of Central Africa, concentrated predominantly in northeastern Democratic Republic of the Congo.

References

Ethnic groups in the Democratic Republic of the Congo